Airborne Museum may refer to:
Airborne Museum 'Hartenstein', Oosterbeek, Netherlands
Airborne Museum (Sainte-Mère-Église), France